The Age of Majority Act 1971, is a Malaysian law which was enacted to amend and consolidate the laws relating to the age of majority.

According to the Act, the age of majority is 18 years old, so that below than 18 years old is considered as minor. The age of majority should not be confused with other types of ages (e.g. voting age, marriageable age, age of consent, legal working age, school leaving age, legal driving age, smoking age, legal drinking age, age of criminal responsibility, age of candidacy for political offices, etc.) because different ages are set for these types of ages.

Structure
The Age of Majority Act 1971, in its current form (1 January 2006), consists of only 5 sections and 1 schedule (including no amendment), without separate Parts.
 Section 1: Short title
 Section 2: Age of majority 
 Section 3: Interpretation
 Section 4: Savings
 Section 5: Repeal
 Schedule

References

External links
 Age of Majority Act 1971 

1971 in Malaysian law
Malaysian federal legislation
Acts of the Parliament of Malaysia